Miles Edward Frank Briggs (born 30 March 1983) is a British politician of the Scottish Conservative, who has served as a regional list Member of the Scottish Parliament (MSP) for the Lothian region since the 2016 Scottish Parliament election. He served as the Scottish Conservative Shadow Cabinet member for Health and Sport from 2017 to 2020 and as the Scottish Conservative Chief Whip from 2020 to 2021.

Early life
Briggs was born in Preston, Lancashire in England, before moving to Perthshire with his family when he was young. Briggs was educated at Auchtergaven Primary School, Perth Grammar School and Robert Gordon University.

Political career
Briggs was the official Conservative Party candidate at the 2010 general election for the North East Fife constituency, then in the 2011 Scottish Parliament election for North East Fife. In 2016, he stood for the Edinburgh Southern constituency.

In December 2015, Briggs was named second on the Scottish Conservatives' Lothian regional list in the 2016 Scottish Parliament election, behind party leader Ruth Davidson.

Briggs is the Scottish Conservative spokesman for Mental Health and Public Health in the Scottish Parliament In addition, he sits on the Health and Sport Committee of the Scottish Parliament.

Briggs was announced as the official Conservative Party candidate for Edinburgh South West at the 2017 general election. He finished in second place, and received 16,478 votes, behind the sitting SNP MP, Joanna Cherry. Despite not being elected, Briggs was successful in significantly reducing Cherry's majority from 8,135 votes at the previous election, to just 1,097 votes.

On 12 January 2022, Briggs called for Boris Johnson to resign as Conservative party leader and Prime Minister over the Westminster lockdown parties controversy along with a majority of Scottish Conservative MSPs.

Controversy
In 2018, Briggs was accused by a woman from another political party of sexual harassment at a parliamentary event. After an internal investigation, the Scottish Conservatives found Briggs not guilty of making "unwanted persistent advances" towards the woman. Women's rights charity Rape Crisis Scotland voiced "significant concerns" with how the investigation was conducted and called on the Scottish Conservatives to change the way they investigate claims of sexual harassment. The charity claimed that the party would not reveal whether the investigating committee had received training in how to investigate sexual harassment complaints.

References

External links 
 

1983 births
Living people
Alumni of Robert Gordon University
Conservative MSPs
Members of the Scottish Parliament 2016–2021
Members of the Scottish Parliament 2021–2026
People from Perth and Kinross
Place of birth missing (living people)
Scottish Conservative Party parliamentary candidates